The Piano & a Microphone Tour was the final concert tour by American recording artist Prince. In a December 2015 interview in anticipation of the tour, he said that "I’m doing it to challenge myself, I won’t know what songs I’m going to do when I go on stage. I won’t have to, because I won’t have a band". It was ultimately Prince's final tour due to his sudden death from a fentanyl overdose on April 21, 2016, one week after the last tour date.

Personnel
 Prince – vocals and piano

Set list
Setlist of show in Melbourne:

Early Show
 "Big City"
 "Ruff Enuff"
 "Little Red Corvette" / "Dirty Mind"
 "Money Don't Matter 2 Night"
 "Waiting in Vain" / "If I Was Your Girlfriend"
 "How Come U Don't Call Me Anymore?"
 "The Ladder"
 "1000 X's & O's"
 "When She Comes"
 "Satisfied"
 "I Love U in Me"
 "Automatic"
 "Sometimes It Snows in April" (contains elements of "Purple Rain")
 "The Beautiful Ones"
"Raspberry Beret"
"Starfish and Coffee"
"Paisley Park"
Encore
"Adore"

Late Show
 "The Love We Make"
 "Over the Rainbow"
 "Big City"
 "Ruff Enuff"
 "Little Red Corvette" / "Dirty Mind"
 "The Ballad of Dorothy Parker" (contains elements of "Four")
 "The Max"
 "I Wanna Be Your Lover"
 "Do Me, Baby"
 "Sweet Thing"
 "How Come U Don't Call Me Anymore"
 "Waiting in Vain" / "If I Was Your Girlfriend"
 "The Ladder"
 "The Beautiful Ones"
 "1000 X's & O's"
 "Black Muse"
 "Raspberry Beret" 
Encore
"Starfish and Coffee"
"Paisley Park"
"Purple Rain"

 The first show on February 16, in Melbourne, Australia, Prince dedicated performances of "Little Red Corvette", "Dirty Mind", "The Ladder", "The Beautiful Ones" and "Adore" in special tribute to Vanity, who died on February 15, 2016. He also shared memorable heart-felt stories when they were together.
During the first show Prince also performed "A Place in Heaven", an unreleased instrumental track from 1983 or 1984, seemingly in connection with the passing of Vanity.

Shows

Cancellations and/or rescheduled shows

Prince was also scheduled to perform in the UK, including the Theatre Royal Drury Lane in London, Glasgow and Birmingham, however these were cancelled due to ticket touts and the Paris attacks.

Box office score data

References

External links
Prince: Piano & a Microphone Tour 2016
Prince Concert & Tour History

Prince (musician) concert tours
2016 concert tours